R. A. M. Obaidul Muktadir Chowdhury was an assistant secretary in the government of Bangladesh. He is a Bangladesh Awami League politician and the incumbent Member of Parliament from Brahmanbaria-3.

Early life
Chowdhury was born on 1 March 1955. He has B.S.S and MSS from the University of Dhaka. Besides he also studied Diploma in Rural Poverty Alleviation Asian Institute of Technology (AIT), Bangkok)

Career
Chowdhury was an assistant secretary in the government of Bangladesh. Chowdhury was elected to Parliament in 2014 as a Bangladesh Awami League candidate from Brahmanbaria-3. He is the Chairman of the parliamentary standing committee on Ministry of Hill Tracts.

According to newspaper report, his supporters attacked Hindu owned homes and business in November 2016. A Bangladesh Police investigation blamed local political feud and negligence of the local police for the religious violence. Prime Minister Sheikh Hasina expressed anger over Chowdhury's role in the religious violence. In November 2017, he called journalists "illiterate, inefficient, and  corrupt". He is the President of Brahmanbaria district Awami League.

References

Awami League politicians
Living people
10th Jatiya Sangsad members
University of Dhaka alumni
1955 births
11th Jatiya Sangsad members